Ship Ahoy is a 1942 American musical-comedy film directed by Edward Buzzell and starring Eleanor Powell and Red Skelton. It was produced by MGM.

Background
Ship Ahoy was the first of two films in which Powell and Skelton co-starred. It is considered a lesser effort on both actors' behalf, however the film is chiefly remembered today for including Frank Sinatra, who appears in an uncredited performance as a singer with the Tommy Dorsey Orchestra. The movie also is credited with one of the most unusual displays of dance on screen for a sequence in which Powell's character, needing to communicate a message to a (real) US agent in the audience of one of her shows, manages to tap out the message in morse code. (Reportedly, Powell taps genuine code during the performance.)

The film was to be called Ill Take Manila, but was renamed after the attack on Pearl Harbor. Skelton and Powell next paired up in 1943's I Dood It. In that film, they appeared with Jimmy Dorsey, Tommy's brother.

Plot
Tallulah Winters is a dancing star who is hired to perform on an ocean liner. Before she leaves, she is recruited by what she believes is a branch of the American government and asked to smuggle a prototype explosive mine out of the country. In fact, she is unknowingly working for Nazi agents who have stolen the mine. Meanwhile, Merton Kibble, a writer of pulp fiction adventure stories but suffering from severe writer's block, is on the same ship and soon he finds himself embroiled in Tallulah's real-life adventure.

Cast
 Eleanor Powell as Tallulah Winters
 Red Skelton as Merton K. Kibble
 Bert Lahr as "Skip" Owens
 Virginia O'Brien as Fran Evans
 William Post Jr. as H. U. Bennett
 James Cross as "Stump"
 Eddie Hartman as "Stumpy"
 Stuart Crawford as Art Higgins
 John Emery as Dr. Farno
 Bernard Nedell as Pietro Polesi
 Tommy Dorsey as himself
 Frank Sinatra as himself
 Buddy Rich as himself
 Ziggy Elman as himself
 Moroni Olsen as Inspector Davis
 George Watts as Hotel detective
 Ralph Dunn as Flammer
 William Tannen as Grimes

Reception
According to MGM records the film earned $1,831,000 at the US and Canadian box office and $676,000 elsewhere, making the studio a profit of $1,470,000.

References

External links
 
 
 
 

1942 films
1942 musical comedy films
1942 romantic comedy films
American musical comedy films
American romantic comedy films
American romantic musical films
American black-and-white films
1940s English-language films
Films directed by Edward Buzzell
Films set on ships
Metro-Goldwyn-Mayer films
Films with screenplays by Irving Brecher
Films with screenplays by Harry Kurnitz
1940s American films